The General Aviation Design Bureau T-32 Maverick is a Ukrainian ultralight trike under development by the General Aviation Design Bureau of Ukraine, based in Kyiv. The aircraft is intended to be supplied as a kit for amateur construction or as a complete ready-to-fly-aircraft.

The company has constructed trike designs for other manufacturers under contract in the past, but the T-32 is their own design.

Design and development
As a three-seat trike the T-32 Maverick does not comply with the Fédération Aéronautique Internationale microlight or the US light-sport aircraft categories, which are both limited to two seats, but may fit some country's amateur-built aircraft rules.

The T-32 Maverick features a cable-braced hang glider-style high-wing, weight-shift controls, a three-seat open cockpit, with the pilot sitting in front and a two-seat bench in the back, with a cockpit fairing. It can be mounted on tricycle landing gear or floats and has a single engine in pusher configuration.

The aircraft is made from bolted-together aluminum tubing, with its double surface wing covered in Dacron sailcloth. Its  span wing is supported by a single tube-type kingpost and uses an "A" frame weight-shift control bar. The aircraft has many powerplant options, including the twin cylinder, liquid-cooled, two-stroke, dual-ignition  Rotax 582 engine, the four cylinder, air and liquid-cooled, four-stroke, dual-ignition  Rotax 912UL or  Rotax 912ULS engine and the turbocharged  Rotax 914. Automotive conversion engines of  can also be fitted.

Specifications (T-32 Maverick)

References

2010s Ukrainian sport aircraft
Single-engined pusher aircraft
Ultralight trikes